This is a list of FIPS 10-4 region codes from D-F, using a standardized name format, and cross-linking to articles.

On September 2, 2008, FIPS 10-4 was one of ten standards withdrawn by NIST as a Federal Information Processing Standard. The list here is the last version of codes. For earlier versions, see link below.

DA: Denmark

DJ: Djibouti

DO: Dominica

DR: Dominican Republic

EC: Ecuador

EG: Egypt

EI: Ireland

EK: Equatorial Guinea

EN: Estonia

ER: Eritrea

ES: El Salvador

ET: Ethiopia

EZ: Czech Republic

FI: Finland

FJ: Fiji

FM: Federated States of Micronesia

FR: France

See also
 List of FIPS region codes (A-C)
 List of FIPS region codes (G-I)
 List of FIPS region codes (J-L)
 List of FIPS region codes (M-O)
 List of FIPS region codes (P-R)
 List of FIPS region codes (S-U)
 List of FIPS region codes (V-Z)

Sources
 FIPS 10-4 Codes and history
 Last version of codes
 All codes (include earlier versions)
 Table to see the evolution of the codes over time
 Administrative Divisions of Countries ("Statoids"), Statoids.com

References

Region codes